The OGK is an American professional wrestling tag team consisting of Matt Taven and Mike Bennett.

The team was first formed in Ring of Honor (ROH), as part of the larger The Kingdom stable. Besides ROH, they are best known for their time spent in New Japan Pro-Wrestling (NJPW) and Impact Wrestling, in the latter being part of the Honor No More stable. They are four-time tag team champions, being two-time ROH World Tag Team Champions, one-time Impact World Tag Team Champions and one-time IWGP Tag Team Champions.

History

Ring of Honor

The Kingdom (2014–2015)

On March 1, 2015, at the 13th Anniversary Show, Bennett and Taven defeated The Addiction (Christopher Daniels and Frankie Kazarian) as well as Karl Anderson (who competed on his own due to Doc Gallows suffering travel issues) in a three-way tag team match. On March 27, 2015, at Supercard of Honor IX, Bennett and Taven unsuccessfully challenged reDRagon (Bobby Fish and Kyle O'Reilly) for the ROH World Tag Team Championship. Cole returned from his injury at War of the Worlds ‘15, where he lost to A.J. Styles. Cole then began having tension with Bennett and Taven and even teased a reunion with former Future Shock partner Kyle O’Reilly. On September 18 at All Star Extravaganza VII, Bennett and Taven won their first-ever ROH World Tag Team Championship, when they defeated the then champions The Addiction (Frankie Kazarian and Christopher Daniels) and The Young Bucks (Matt Jackson and Nick Jackson). Later that night Cole betrayed O’Reilly during his world championship match against Jay Lethal remaining with The Kingdom and turning heel once again.  Bennett and Taven lost the title to War Machine on December 18 at Final Battle. Bennett and Kanellis left ROH after the following day's Ring of Honor Wrestling taping, after failing to come to terms on a new contract with the promotion.

The OGK (2020–2021)
In 2020, after Ring of Honor returned from hiatus due to COVID-19, Taven and Marseglia (now named Vincent) reignited their rivalry, with Vincent teaming with Bateman as The Righteous. On November 21, 2020, episode of Ring of Honor Wrestling, Mike Bennett made his return to Ring of Honor helping his former Kingdom partner Taven fight off Vincent and Bateman. On December 10, at Final Battle, The OGK defeated The Righteous (Vincent and Bateman) in a grudge tag team match.

On November 14, 2021, at Honor For All, The OGK defeated La Faccion Ingobernable (Dragon Lee and Kenny King) to become two-time ROH World Tag Team Champions.

On December 11, 2021, The OGK lost the ROH World Tag Team Championships to The Briscoe Brothers at Final Battle.

New Japan Pro-Wrestling (2014–2015) 

Bennett and Taven, made their debut as a team in New Japan Pro Wrestling in November 2014, to take part in the 2014 World Tag League. They finished third in their block with a record of four wins and three losses. Bennett and Taven returned to NJPW on April 5, 2015, at Invasion Attack 2015, where they defeated Bullet Club (Doc Gallows and Karl Anderson) to win the IWGP Tag Team Championship. On July 5 at Dominion 7.5 in Osaka-jo Hall, The Kingdom lost the IWGP Tag Team Championship back to Bullet Club in their first defense. Bennett and Taven returned to NJPW in November to take part in the 2015 World Tag League, where they finished with a record of two wins and four losses, failing to advance from their block.

National Wrestling Alliance (2021–2022)
On October 24, 2021, at NWA By Any Means Necessary, The OGK made their NWA debut defeating The Fixers (Jay Bradley and Wrecking Ball Legursky).

The OGK made their NWA return at Hard Times 2 successfully defending the ROH World Tag Team Championships against Aron Stevens and JR Kratos.

On February 12, 2022, at NWA PowerrrTrip, The OGK were defeated by The Fixers (Jay Bradley and Wrecking Ball Legursky) in the first round of the Crockett Cup tournament.

Impact Wrestling (2022)
On January 8, 2022, at Hard To Kill, The OGK made their Impact Wrestling debut along with PCO and Vinny Marseglia attacking Heath, Rhino and others following their match.

On August 26, 2022, Taven and Bennett defeated The Good Brothers (Doc Gallows and Karl Anderson) to win the Impact World Tag Team Championships. This match aired on tape delay on the September 1 episode of Impact!. On October 8, 2022, during the Impact! taping, The Kingdom lost the Impact World Tag Team Championships to Heath and Rhino.

On October 8, 2022, it was announced that Bennett, Kanellis and Taven had departed Impact Wrestling.

Championships and accomplishments 
Impact Wrestling
 Impact World Tag Team Championship (1 time)

New Japan Pro-Wrestling
IWGP Tag Team Championship (1 time)

 Ring of Honor
ROH World Tag Team Championship (2 times)

 The Wrestling Revolver
PWR Tag Team Championship (1 time, current)

References

All Elite Wrestling teams and stables
Ring of Honor teams and stables
National Wrestling Alliance teams and stables
New Japan Pro-Wrestling teams and stables
Independent promotions teams and stables
Impact Wrestling teams and stables